The National Heritage Fellowship is a lifetime honor presented to master folk and traditional artists by the National Endowment for the Arts.  Similar to Japan's Living National Treasure award, the Fellowship is the United States government's highest honor in the folk and traditional arts. It is a one-time only award and fellows must be living citizens or permanent residents of the United States. Each year, fellowships are presented to between nine and fifteen artists or groups at a ceremony in Washington, D.C.

The Fellows are nominated by individual citizens, with an average of over 200 nominations per year. From that pool of candidates, recommendations are made by a rotating panel of specialists, including one layperson, as well as folklorists and others with a variety of forms of cultural expertise. The recommendations are then reviewed by the National Council on the Arts, with the final decisions made by the chairperson of the National Endowment for the Arts. As of 2022, 467 artists in a wide variety of fields have received Fellowships.

History
The program was officially founded in 1982 by Bess Lomax Hawes, the first director of the Folk and Traditional Arts Program at the NEA, following a five-year period of development. In 1982, the monetary award associated with the Fellowship was $5,000; in 1993, it was increased to $10,000 and since 2009, the award amount is $25,000, which is considered "enough to make a difference, but not enough to go to anyone's head". Each recipient receives a certificate of honor, the monetary award, and a congratulatory letter from the President of the United States.

The annual recognition events are held in the Fall and consist of an awards ceremony, a banquet, and a concert that is open to the public. Over the years, the awards ceremony has been held at different locations in the US capitol city, including the NEA headquarters, Ford's Theatre, George Washington University, the Library of Congress, and for the first time at the White House in 1995. Since 2000, the banquet has been held in the Great Hall of the Library of Congress. The concert features musical performances, craft demonstrations, and interviews with the honorees. Masters of ceremonies at the concerts have included folksinger Pete Seeger, actress Ruby Dee, author Studs Terkel, journalist Charles Kuralt, and since 1997 Nick Spitzer, the host of public radio program American Routes. Beginning in 2010, the Fellowship concerts have been streamed live on the NEA website and archived on YouTube.

In 2000, the NEA instituted the Bess Lomax Hawes Award in conjunction with the Fellowships, "given to an individual for achievements in fostering excellence, ensuring vitality, and promoting public appreciation of the folk and traditional arts". The Hawes Award has been given annually since 2000 to recognize "artists whose contributions, primarily through teaching, advocacy, and organizing and preserving important repertoires, have greatly benefited their artistic tradition. It also recognizes individuals, such as producers and activists, who have comprehensively increased opportunities for and public visibility of traditional artists."

Publications
 A companion volume titled American Folk Masters: The National Heritage Fellows was published in 1992 to accompany a traveling exhibition (1991–1994) called "America's Living Folk Traditions" that featured the artistry of 36 Fellowship recipients.
 A two-volume biographical dictionary of the award winners from the first 20 years was published in 2001, titled Masters of Traditional Arts.
A young readers book featuring five of the National Heritage Fellows entitled Extraordinary Ordinary People: Five American Masters of Traditional Arts was published in 2006.

Winners
Awardees have included Native American basket weavers, African American blues musicians, traditional fiddlers, Mexican American accordionists, and all manner of traditional artisans and performers of numerous ethnic backgrounds.



National Heritage Fellowship winners are:

1982
Dewey Balfa, Cajun fiddler
Joe Heaney, Irish sean-nós singer
Tommy Jarrell, Appalachian fiddler
Bessie Jones, singer, member of the Georgia Sea Island Singers
George López, Santos woodcarver
Brownie McGhee, blues guitarist
Hugh McGraw, shape note singer
Lydia Mendoza, Mexican American singer
Bill Monroe, bluegrass musician
Elijah Pierce, carver and painter
Adam Popovich, Tamburitza musician
Georgeann Robinson, Osage ribbonworker
Duff Severe, saddlemaker
Philip Simmons, ornamental ironworker and blacksmith
Sanders "Sonny" Terry, blues musician

1983
Sister Mildred Barker, Shaker singer
Rafael Cepeda, bomba dancer and musician
Ray Hicks, Appalachian storyteller
Stanley Hicks, Appalachian musician and storyteller
John Lee Hooker, blues guitarist and singer
Mike Manteo, Sicilian marionettist (Marionette maker)
Narciso Martínez, accordionist and composer
Lanier Meaders, potter from Georgia
Almeda Riddle, ballad singer
Simon St. Pierre, French American fiddler from Maine
Joe Shannon (piper), Irish piper
Alex Stewart, copper and woodworker
Ada Thomas, Chitimacha basketmaker
Lucinda Toomer, African American quilter
Lem Ward, duck decoy maker and painter
Dewey Williams, shape note singer

1984
Clifton Chenier, zydeco accordionist
Bertha Cook, knotted bedspread maker
Joseph Cormier, violinist
Elizabeth Cotten, guitarist and songwriter
Burlon Craig, potter
Albert Fahlbusch, hammered dulcimer maker and player
Janie Hunter, singer and storyteller
Mary Jane Manigault, seagrass basket maker
Genevieve Mougin, lace maker
Martin Mulvihill, fiddler
Howard "Sandman" Sims, tap dancer
Ralph Stanley, Appalachian banjo player and singer
Margaret Tafoya, potter
Dave Tarras, klezmer clarinetist
Paul Tiulana, Eskimo maskmaker, dancer, and singer
Cleofes Vigil, storyteller and singer
Emily Kau'i Zuttermeister, hula master

1985
Eppie Archuleta, weaver
Alice New Holy Blue Legs, Lakota Sioux quill artist
Periklis Halkias, clarinetist
Jimmy Jausoro, accordionist
Meali'i Kalama, quilter
Lily May Ledford, Appalachian musician and singer
Leif Melgaard, woodcarver
Bua Xou Mua, Hmong musician
Julio Negrón-Rivera, instrument maker
Glenn Ohrlin, cowboy singer, storyteller, and illustrator
Henry Townsend, blues musician and songwriter
Horace "Spoons" Williams, spoons and bones player and poet

1986
Alphonse "Bois Sec" Ardoin, Creole accordionist
Earnest Bennett, whittler
Helen Cordero, potter
Sonia Domsch, bobbin lace maker
Canray Fontenot, Creole fiddler
John Jackson, songster and guitarist
Peou Khatna, Cambodian court dancer and choreographer
Valerio Longoria, accordionist
Doc Tate Nevaquaya, Comanche flutist
Luis Ortega, rawhide worker
Ola Belle Reed, Appalachian banjo picker/singer
Jennie Thlunaut, Chilkat blanket weaver
Nimrod Workman, Appalachian ballad singer

1987
Juan Alindato, Carnival maskmaker
Louis Bashell, polka musician
Genoveva Castellanoz, corona maker
Thomas Edison Ford, cowboy singer and storyteller
Kansuma Fujima, Japanese classical dancer
Claude Joseph Johnson, religious singer and orator
Raymond Kane, slack key guitarist and singer
Wade Mainer, bluegrass banjoist
Sylvester McIntosh, singer and bandleader
Allison "Tootie" Montana, Mardi Gras Indian chief and costume maker
Alex Moore, Sr., blues pianist
Emilio and Senaida Romero, tin embroiderers
Newton Washburn, split ash basketmaker

1988
Pedro Ayala, accordionist
Kepka Belton, egg painter
Amber Densmore, quilter and needleworker
Michael Flatley, Irish step dancer
Sister Rosalia Haberl, bobbin lacemaker
John Dee Holeman, dancer, musician, and singer
 Albert "Sunnyland Slim" Luandrew, blues pianist and singer
Yang Fang Nhu, weaver and embroiderer
Kenny Sidle, fiddler
Willie Mae Ford Smith, gospel singer
Clyde "Kindy" Sproat, cowboy singer and ukulele player
Arthel "Doc" Watson, guitarist and singer

1989
John Cephas, Piedmont blues guitarist and singer
The Fairfield Four, a capella gospel singers
José Gutiérrez, Jarocho musician and singer
Richard Avedis Hagopian, oud player
Christy Hengel, concertina maker
Ilias Kementzides, lyra player
Ethel Kvalheim, rosemaler
Vanessa Paukeigope Morgan, Kiowa regalia maker
Mabel E. Murphy, quilter
LaVaughn Robinson, tap dancer and choreographer
Earl Scruggs, banjo player
Harry V. Shourds, wildlife decoy carver
Chesley Goseyun Wilson, Apache fiddle maker

1990
Howard Armstrong, string band musician
Em Bun, silk weaver
Nati Cano, Mariachi musician, leader of Mariachi los Camperos
Giuseppe and Raffaela DeFranco, Southern Italian musicians and dancers
Maude Kegg, Ojibwe storyteller and craftswoman
Kevin Locke, Lakota flute player, singer, and dancer
Marie McDonald, lei maker
Wally McRae, cowboy poet
Art Moilanen, accordionist
Emilio Rosado, woodcarver
Robert Spicer, flatfoot dancer
Douglas Wallin, Appalachian ballad singer

1991
Etta Baker, guitarist
George Blake, Hupa-Yurok craftsman
Jack Coen, flautist
Rose Frank, cornhusk weaver
Eduardo "Lalo" Guerrero, singer, guitarist, and composer
Khamvong Insixiengmai, singer
Don King, western saddlemaker
Riley "B.B." King, bluesman
Esther Littlefield, Tlingit regalia maker
Seisho "Harry" Nakasone, musician
Irvan Perez, Isleño décima singer and woodcarver
Morgan Sexton, Appalachian banjo player and singer
Nikitas Tsimouris, bagpipe player
Gussie Wells, quilter
Arbie Williams, quilter
Melvin Wine, Appalachian fiddler

1992
Francisco Aguabella, drummer
Jerry Brown, stoneware potter
Walker Calhoun, Cherokee musician, dancer and teacher
Clyde Davenport, Appalachian fiddler
Belle Deacon, basketmaker
Nora Ezell, quilter
Gerald R. Hawpetoss, Menominee/Potawatomi regalia maker
Fatima Kuinova, Bukharan Jewish singer
John Naka, bonsai sculptor
Marc Savoy, accordion maker/musician
Ng Sheung-Chi, muk'yu folk singer
Othar Turner, fife player
T. Viswanathan, flutist and vocalist

1993
Santiago Almeida, conjunto musician
Kenny Baker, bluegrass fiddler
Inez Catalon, French Creole singer
Nicholas & Elena Charles, Yupik woodcarvers, maskmakers, and skinsewers
Charles Hankins, boatbuilder
Nalani Kanaka'ole & Pualani Kanaka'ole Kanahel, hula masters
Everett Kapayou, Mesquakie singer
McIntosh County Shouters, spiritual/shout performers
Elmer Miller, bit & spur maker/silversmith
Jack Owens, blues singer and guitarist
Mone & Vanxay Saenphimmachak, weavers, needleworkers, and loommakers
Liang-xing Tang, pipa player

1994
Clarence Fountain & The Blind Boys, gospel singers
Liz Carroll, fiddler
Mary Mitchell Gabriel, Passamaquoddy basketmaker
Johnny Gimble, Western swing fiddler
Frances Varos Graves, colcha embroiderer
Violet Hilbert, Skagit storyteller
Sosei Shizuye Matsumoto, Chado tea ceremony master
D. L. Menard, Cajun songwriter and musician
Simon Shaheen, oud player
Lily Vorperian, Marash-style embroiderer
Elder Roma Wilson, gospel blues harmonica player

1995
Mary Holiday Black, Navajo basketweaver
Lyman Enloe, fiddler
Donny Golden, Irish step dancer
Wayne Henderson, luthier
Bea Ellis Hensley, blacksmith
Nathan Jackson, Tlingit woodcarver, metalsmith, dancer
Danongan Kalanduyan, kulintang musician
Robert Jr. Lockwood, Delta blues guitarist
Israel López, bassist, composer, and bandleader
Nellie Star Boy Menard, Lakota Sioux quiltmaker
Bao Mo-Li, jing erhu player
Buck Ramsey, cowboy poet and singer

1996
Obo Addy, drummer
Betty Pisio Christenson, egg decorator
Paul Dahlin, fiddler
Juan Gutiérrez, drummer
Solomon & Richard Ho'opi'I, Hawaiian singers
Will Keys, banjo player
Joaquin Flores Lujan, blacksmith
Eva McAdams, Shoshone regalia maker
John Mealing & Cornelius Wright, Jr., railroad worksong singers
Vernon Owens, stoneware potter
Dolly Spencer, Inupiat dollmaker

1997
Edward Babb, shout band leader
Charles Brown, blues pianist, singer and composer
Gladys Clark, spinner and weaver
Georgia Harris, Catawba potter
Hua Wenyi, Kunqu opera singer
Ali Akbar Khan, classical sarod player
Ramón José López, santero and metalsmith
Jim & Jesse McReynolds, bluegrass musicians
Phong Nguyen (Nguyễn Thuyết Phong), musician and ethnomusicologist
Hystercine Rankin, quilter
Francis Whitaker, blacksmith and ornamental ironworker

1998
Apsara Ensemble, Cambodian traditional dancers and musicians
Eddie Blazonczyk, musician and bandleader
Dale Calhoun, boat builder
Bruce Caesar, Sac and Fox-Pawnee, German silversmith
Antonio De La Rosa, conjunto accordionist
Epstein Brothers, Klezmer musicians
Sophia George, Yakama – Colville beadworker
Nadjeschda Overgaard, hardanger embroidery needleworker
Harilaos Papapostolou, Greek Byzantine chanter
Claude "Fiddler" Williams, jazz and swing fiddler
Pops Staples, gospel and blues musician

1999
Frisner Augustin, Haitian drummer
Lila Greengrass Blackdeer, Ho-Chunk Black Ash basketmaker and needleworker
Shirley Caesar, gospel singer
Alfredo Campos, horse hair hitcher
Mary Louise Defender Wilson, Dakotah-Hidatsa traditionalist and storyteller
Jimmy "Slyde" Godbolt, tapdancer
Ulysses Goode, Western Mono basketmaker
Bob Holt, Ozark fiddler
Zakir Hussain, tabla player
Elliott "Ellie" Mannette, steel pan builder, tuner and player
Mick Moloney, Irish musician
Eudokia Sorochaniuk, Ukrainian American weaver and textile artist
Ralph W. Stanley, boatbuilder

2000
Bounxou Chanthraphone, weaver
The Dixie Hummingbirds, gospel quartet
José González, hammock weaver
Nettie Jackson, Klickitat basketmaker
Santiago Jiménez Jr., accordionist
Genoa Keawe, singer and ukulele player
Frankie Manning, Lindy Hop dancer and choreographer
Joe Willie "Pinetop" Perkins, blues piano player
Konstantinos Pilarinos, Orthodox Byzantine icon woodcarver
Chris Strachwitz, record producer and label founder
Dorothy Thompson, weaver
Felipe García Villamil, drummer and santero
Don Walser, singer and guitarist

2001
Celestino Avilés, santero
Mozell Benson, quilter
Wilson "Boozoo" Chavis, Creole zydeco accordionist
Hazel Dickens, Appalachian singer and songwriter
 João Oliveira dos Santos (Mestre João Grande), Capoeira Angola master
Evalena Henry, Apache basketweaver
Peter Kyvelos, oud maker
Eddie Pennington, thumbpicking-style guitarist
Qi Shu Fang, Beijing Opera performer
Seiichi Tanaka, Taiko drummer and dojo founder
Dorothy Trumpold, rug weaver
Fred Tsoodle, Kiowa sacred song leader
Joseph Wilson, folklorist

2002
Ralph Blizard, fiddler
Loren Bommelyn, Tolowa tradition bearer
Kevin Burke, fiddler
Rose Cree and Francis Cree, Ojibwe basketmakers and storytellers
Luderin Darbone and Edwin Duhon, Cajun fiddler and accordionist
Nadim Dlaikan, nye (reed flute) player
David "Honeyboy" Edwards, blues guitarist and singer
Flory Jagoda, singer, songwriter, and guitarist
Clara Neptune Keezer, Passamaquoddy basketmaker
Bob McQuillen, contra dance musician and composer
Jean Ritchie, Appalachian musician and songwriter
Domingo Saldivar, Conjunto accordionist
Losang Samten, Tibetan monk and creator of sandpaintings

2003
Jesus Arriada, Johnny Curutchet, Martin Goicoechea and Jesus Goni, Basque (Bertsolari) poets
Rosa Elena Egipciaco, mundillo (Puerto Rican bobbin lace) maker 
Agnes "Oshanee" Kenmille, Salish beadworker and regalia maker
Norman Kennedy, weaver, singer, storyteller
Roberto Martinez and Lorenzo Martinez, father and son musicians
Norma Miller, swing dancer and choreographer
Carmencristina Moreno, singer, composer, teacher
Ron Poast, Hardanger fiddle maker
Felipe I. Ruak and Joseph K. Ruak, father and son Carolinian stick dancers
Manoochehr Sadeghi, santur player
Nicholas Toth, diving helmet builder

2004
Anjani Ambegaokar, Kathak dancer
Charles "Chuck" T. Campbell, Gospel steel guitarist
Joe Derrane, Irish-American button accordionist
Jerry Douglas, Dobro player
Gerald "Subiyay" Miller, Skokomish tradition bearer, carver, basket maker
Chum Ngek, Cambodian musician and teacher
Milan Opacich, Tamburitza instrument maker
Eliseo Rodriguez and Paula Rodriguez, husband and wife straw appliqué artists
Koko Taylor, blues musician
Yuqin Wang and Zhengli Xu, Chinese rod puppeteers

2005
Eldrid Skjold Arntzen, rosemaler
Earl Barthé, building artisan
Chuck Brown, musical innovator
Janette Carter, country musician
Michael Doucet, Cajun fiddler, composer, band leader
Big Joe Duskin, blues and boogie-woogie pianist
Jerry Grcevich, Tamburitza musician, prim player
Wanda Jackson, country, rockabilly and gospel singer
Grace Henderson Nez, Navajo weaver
Herminia Albarrán Romero, paper cutting artist
Beyle Schaechter-Gottesman, Yiddish singer, songwriter, and poet
Albertina Walker, gospel singer
James Ka'upena Wong, Hawaiian chanter

2006
Charles M. Carrillo, santero
Delores Elizabeth Churchill, Haida cedar bark weaver
Henry Gray, blues piano player and singer
Doyle Lawson, gospel and bluegrass singer, bandleader
Esther Martinez, Tewa linguist and storyteller
Diomedes Matos, master string instrument maker
George Na'ope, hula master
Wilho Saari, kantele player
Mavis Staples, gospel, rhythm and blues singer
Nancy Sweezy, folklorist and potter
Treme Brass Band, New Orleans brass band

2007
Nicholas Benson, stone letter cutter and calligrapher
Sidiki Conde, Guinean dancer and musician
Violet Kazue de Cristoforo, Haiku poet and historian
Roland Freeman, photo documentarian, author, and exhibit Curator
Pat Courtney Gold, Wasco sally bag weaver
Eddie Kamae, Hawaiian musician
Agustin Lira, Chicano singer and musician,
Julia Parker, Kashia Pomo basketmaker
Mary Jane Queen, Appalachian musician
Joe Thompson, string band musician
Irvin Trujillo, Rio Grande weaver
Elaine Hoffman Watts, Klezmer musician

2008
Horace Axtell, Nez Perce drum maker, singer, tradition-bearer
Dale Harwood, saddlemaker
Bettye Kimbrell, quilter
Jeronimo E. Lozano, Peruvian retablo maker
Oneida Hymn Singers of Wisconsin
Sue Yeon Park, Korean dancer and musician
Moges Seyoum, Ethiopian liturgical minister and scholar
Jelon Vieira, Capoeira master
Dr. Michael White, traditional jazz musician and bandleader
Mac Wiseman, Bluegrass musician
Walter Murray Chiesa, traditional arts specialist and advocate

2009
Birmingham Sunlights, five-man, four-part harmony a cappella gospel group
Edwin Colón Zayas, Puerto Rican cuatro
Chitresh Das, Kathak dancer and choreographer
LeRoy Graber, German-Russian willow basketmaker from South Dakota
"Queen" Ida Guillory, Zydeco musician and singer
Dudley Laufman, Contra and barn dance caller and musician
Amma D. McKen, Yoruba Orisha singer
Joel Nelson, Cowboy poet
Teri Rofkar, Tlingit weaver and basketmaker
Mike Seeger, folk musician, cultural scholar
Sophiline Cheam Shapiro, Cambodian classical dancer and choreographer

2010
Yacub Addy, Ghanaian drum master, preserves music of the Ga people
Jim "Texas Shorty" Chancellor, Texas fiddler
Gladys Kukana Grace, Lauhala (palm leaf) weaver
Mary Jackson, Gullah sweetgrass basketweaver
Delano Floyd "Del" McCoury, Bluegrass guitarist and singer
Judith McCulloh, Folklorist and editor
Kamala Lakshmi Narayanan, Bharatanatyam Indian dancer
Mike Rafferty, Irish flute player
Ezequiel Torres, Afro-Cuban drummer and drum-builder

2011
Laverne Brackens, Quilter
Carlinhos Pandeiro de Ouro, Frame drum player and percussionist
Bo Dollis, Mardi Gras Indian Chief
Jim Griffith, folklorist
Roy and PJ Hirabayashi, Taiko drum leaders
Ledward Kaapana, Ukulele and slack key guitarist
Frank Newsome, Old Regular Baptist singer
Warner Williams, Piedmont blues songster
Yuri Yunakov, Bulgarian saxophonist

2012
 Mike Auldridge, dobro player
 Paul & Darlene Bergren, dog sled and snowshoe designers and builders
 Harold A. Burnham, master shipwright
 Albert B. Head, traditional arts advocate
 Leonardo "Flaco" Jiménez, accordionist
 Lynne Yoshiko Nakasone, dancer
 Molly Neptune Parker, Passamaquoddy basketmaker
 The Paschall Brothers, gospel quartet
 Andy Statman, klezmer clarinetist, mandolinist, and composer

2013
 Sheila Kay Adams, Storyteller and musician
 Ralph Burns, Pyramid Lake Paiute storyteller
 Verónica Castillo, Ceramicist and clay sculptor
 Séamus Connolly, Irish fiddler and scholar
 Nicolae Feraru, Cimbalom player
 Carol Fran, Swamp blues singer and pianist (both French Creole and English singer)
 Pauline Hillaire, Lummi artist, teacher, and storyteller
 David Ivey, Sacred Harp singer
 Ramón "Chunky" Sánchez, Chicano musician

2014

 Henry Arquette, Mohawk basketmaker
 Manuel "Cowboy" Donley, Tejano musician and singer 
 Kevin Doyle, Irish step dancer 
 The Holmes Brothers, blues, gospel, and R&B band 
 Yvonne Walker Keshick, Odawa quill artist
 Carolyn Mazloomi, quilting community advocate 
 Vera Nakonechny, Ukrainian embroiderer and bead worker 
 Singing & Praying Bands of Maryland and Delaware, African-American religious singers 
 Rufus White, Omaha traditional singer and drum group leader

2015

 Rahim AlHaj, oud player & composer
 Michael Alpert, Yiddish musician and tradition bearer
 Mary Lee Bendolph, Lucy Mingo, and Loretta Pettway  — quilters of Gee's Bend
 Dolly Jacobs, circus aerialist
 Yary Livan, Cambodian ceramicist
 Daniel Sheehy, ethnomusicologist/folklorist
 Drink Small, blues artist
 Gertrude Yukie Tsutsumi, Japanese classical dancer
 Sidonka Wadina, Slovak straw artist/egg decorator

2016

 Bryan Akipa, Dakota flute maker and player
 Monk Boudreaux, Mardi Gras Indian craftsman and musician
 Billy McComiskey, Irish button accordionist
 Artemio Posadas, Master Huastecan son musician and advocate
 Clarissa Rizal, Tlingit ceremonial regalia maker
 Theresa Secord, Penobscot Nation ash/sweetgrass basketmaker
 Bounxeung Synanonh, Laotian khaen player
 Michael Vlahovich, master shipwright
 Leona Waddell, white oak basketmaker

2017
 Norik Astvatsaturov, Armenian repoussé metal artist
 Anna Brown Ehlers, Chilkat weaver
 Modesto Cepeda, bomba and plena musician
 Ella Jenkins, children's folk singer and musician
 Dwight Lamb, Danish button accordionist and Missouri-style fiddler
 Thomas Maupin, old-time buckdancer
 Cyril Pahinui, Hawaiian slack key guitarist
 Phil Wiggins, acoustic blues harmonica player
 Eva Ybarra, conjunto accordionist and bandleader

2018
 Feryal Abbasi-Ghnaim, Palestinian embroiderer
 Eddie Bond, Appalachian fiddler
 Kelly Church, Gun Lake Band Potawatomi black ash basket maker
 Marion Coleman, African American quilter
 Manuel Cuevas, Mexican-American rodeo tailor
 Ofelia Esparza, Chicana altarista (Day of the Dead altar maker)
 Barbara Lynn, African American R&B guitarist
 Don and Cindy Roy, French-American musicians
 Ethel Raim, advocate for customary music and dance

2019

 Dan Ansotegui, Basque musician and tradition bearer
 Grant Bulltail, Crow storyteller
 Linda Goss, African-American storyteller
 James F. Jackson, leatherworker
 Balla Kouyaté, balafon player and djeli
 Josephine Lobato, Spanish colcha embroiderer
 Rich Smoker, decoy carver
 Las Tesoros de San Antonio: Beatriz "La Paloma del Norte" Llamas and Blanquita "Blanca Rosa" Rodríguez, Tejano singers
 Bob Fulcher, folklorist

2020

 William Bell, soul singer and songwriter 
 Onnik Dinkjian, Armenian folk and liturgical singer 
 Zakarya and Naomi Diouf, West African diasporic dancers 
 Karen Ann Hoffman, Iroquois raised beadworker 
 Los Matachines de la Santa Cruz de la Ladrillera, traditional religious dancers 
 John Morris, old-time fiddler and banjo player 
 Suni Paz, Nueva Canción singer and songwriter 
 Wayne Valliere, birchbark canoe builder 
 Hugo N. Morales, radio producer and radio network builder

2021

 Cedric Burnside, Hill Country blues musician 
 Tagumpay De Leon, Rondalla musician
 Anita Fields, Osage ribbon worker
 Los Lobos, Mexican-American band
 Joanie Madden, Irish flute player 
 Reginald McLaughlin, tap dancer
 Nellie Vera Sánchez, Mundillo master weaver
 Winnsboro Easter Rock Ensemble, Easter Rock spiritual ensemble
 Tom Davenport, filmmaker, documentarian, and media curator

2022

 Michael Cleveland, bluegrass fiddler
 Eva Enciñias, flamenco artist
 Excelsior Band, brass band musicians
 Stanley Jacobs, quelbe flutist and bandleader
 The Legendary Ingramettes, gospel musicians
 Francis Palani Sinenci, Hawaiian hale builder
 Tsering Wangmo Satho, Tibetan opera singer and dancer
 C. Brian Williams, step artist and producer
 Shaka Zulu, Black masking craftsman, stilt dancer and musician
 TahNibaa Naataanii, Navajo (Diné) textile artist and weaver

References

External links
 
 List of all NEA National Heritage Fellowships through 2019, by recipient name

 
Awards established in 1982
Arts awards in the United States
Fellowships
1982 establishments in the United States
National Endowment for the Arts